The 12th Infantry Brigade was a formation of the Royal Hungarian Army that participated in the Axis invasion of Yugoslavia during World War II.

Organisation

Commanders
12th Infantry Brigade
Brigadier General József Benke (23 Jan 1939 - 1 Feb 1940)
Brigadier General Kalmán Török  (1 Feb 1940 - 1 Aug 1941)
Brigadier General Gábor Illésházy  (1 Aug 1941 - 17 Feb 1942)
12th Light Division
Brigadier General Gábor Illésházy  (17 Feb 1942 - 8 Aug 1942)
Colonel Elemér Sáska  (8 Aug 1942 - 23 Sep 1942)
Brigadier General Ulászlo Solymossy  (1 Oct 1942 - 10 Aug 1943)
12th Reserve Division
Brigadier General Jénö Bor  (10 Aug 1943 - 5 Apr 1944)
Brigadier General Dézö Pötze  (5 Apr 1944 - ? May 1944)
Brigadier General Béla Németh  (? May 1944 - 28 Sep 1944)
Colonel Jenö Tömöry  (29 Sep 1944 - 23 Oct 1944)
12th Infantry Division
Colonel Jenö Tömöry  (23 Oct 1944 - 26 Oct 1944)
Brigadier General Ference Mikófalvy  (26 Oct 1944 - 6 Dec 1944)
Brigadier General István Baumann  (6 Dec 1944 - 12 Feb 1945)

Notes

References

 

Military units and formations of Hungary in World War II